William Campuzano (born May 27, 1986) is a Mexican-American professional mixed martial artist currently competing in the Bantamweight division. A professional competitor since 2008, Campuzano has also formerly competed for the UFC, WEC, Vale Tudo Japan, and Legacy FC.

Mixed martial arts career

Early career
Campuzano found his way into the world of mixed martial arts while attending college. "I used to fight a lot, like out on the street. When I was in college ... I took a Tae Kwon Do course where I met Tom Seabourne. He introduced me to Marcus Lanier who was a professional MMA fighter. He was looking for an assistant that could speak Spanish. He had just opened up his own school in Mount Pleasant. And that got me into MMA."

Campuzano won the first six fights of his mixed martial arts career, all by stoppage.

World Extreme Cagefighting 
He made his WEC debut as a short-notice replacement against Damacio Page at WEC 43, filling in for an injured Akitoshi Tamura. Page submitted Campuzano in the first round.

In his next fight, Campuzano defeated Coty Wheeler on January 10, 2010 at WEC 46 via unanimous decision.  The bout earned the Fight of the Night award.

Campuzano was expected to face Rafael Rebello on June 20, 2010 at WEC 49, but instead faced former WEC Bantamweight Champion Eddie Wineland. He lost the fight via TKO in the second round.

Ultimate Fighting Championship
In October 2010, World Extreme Cagefighting merged with the Ultimate Fighting Championship. As part of the merger, all WEC fighters were transferred to the UFC. Campuzano faced Nick Pace on December 4, 2010 at The Ultimate Fighter: Team GSP vs. Team Koscheck Finale. The fight was supposed to be the first bantamweight bout in UFC history, but Pace missed weight and the fight was changed to a catchweight bout. Campuzano lost the fight due to a pillory choke at 4:32 of round 3.

Campuzano faced Chris Cariaso on January 22, 2011 at UFC Fight Night 23. For the fight, Campuzano moved his fight camp to Sacramento, California with Urijah Faber and his team, Team Alpha Male.  He lost the fight via unanimous decision and was subsequently was released from the UFC.

Legacy Fighting Championship
Campuzano made his Legacy FC debut back in August 2008, when he defeated Seth Drago via guillotine choke submission at LFC 2: Anarchy. After a short stint in the UFC, he returned to Legacy FC and defeated Jimmy Flick in the main event of LFC 16 to become the inaugural Flyweight Champion.

Campuzano would successfully defend his Legacy FC title, when he defeated Allan Nascimento via unanimous decision at LFC 19 on April 12, 2013.

Return to the UFC
After going 5-0 since being released from the UFC, Campuzano returned to the Octagon as he stepped in on a one-week notice for the injured Vaughan Lee to take on Sergio Pettis. He lost the fight via unanimous decision.

Campuzano was expected to face Darrell Montague on March 15, 2014 at UFC 171.  However, Montague pulled out of the bout citing an injury and was replaced by Justin Scoggins. He lost the fight via unanimous decision, and was subsequently released from the promotion once again.

Post-UFC career
After getting released from the UFC for a second time, Campuzano made a quick turnaround and faced Esdo de Paz at MMA 300: Salvador on May 24, 2014. He won the fight via triangle choke.

Personal life
Will Campuzano lives with his wife and 2 sons in Frisco, TX. He is the owner and head instructor of Campuzano Martial Arts, which is a 4,000 sf facility with 2 mats in Frisco, TX (Corner of Stonebrook & Teel).

Championships and accomplishments
Legacy Fighting Championship
LFC Flyweight Championship (One time)
World Extreme Cagefighting
Fight of the Night (One time)

Mixed martial arts record

|-
|Win
|align=center|14–6
|Esdo de Paz
|Submission (triangle choke)
||MMA 300: El Salvador
|
|align=center|3
|align=center|1:20
|San Salvador, San Salvador, El Salvador
|
|-
|Loss
|align=center|13–6
|Justin Scoggins
|Decision (unanimous)
|UFC 171
|
|align=center|3
|align=center|5:00
|Dallas, Texas, United States
|
|-
|Loss
|align=center|13–5 
| Sergio Pettis
|Decision (unanimous)
|UFC 167
|
|align=center|3
|align=center|5:00
|Las Vegas, Nevada, United States
|
|-
|Win
|align=center|13–4
| Hideo Tokoro
|Decision (split)
| Vale Tudo Japan: VTJ 3rd
|
|align=center|3
|align=center|5:00
|Tokyo, Japan
|
|-
|Win
|align=center|12–4
| Allan Nascimento
|Decision (unanimous)
|Legacy FC 19
|
|align=center|5
|align=center|5:00
|Dallas, Texas, United States
|
|-
|Win
|align=center|11–4
| Jimmy Flick
|TKO (knee & punches)
|Legacy FC 16
|
|align=center|2
|align=center|0:26
|Dallas, Texas, United States
|
|-
|Win
|align=center|10–4
| Joshua Sampo
|KO (knee)
|RTP: Rumble Time Promotions
|
|align=center|3
|align=center|1:18
|St. Charles, Missouri, United States
|
|-
|Win
|align=center|9–4
| Randy Hinds
|Submission (rear-naked choke)
|24/7 Entertainment Presents Professional Cage Fighting
|
|align=center|1
|align=center|2:18
|Midland, Texas, United States
|
|-
|Loss
|align=center|8–4
| Chris Cariaso
|Decision (unanimous)
|UFC: Fight for the Troops 2
|
|align=center|3
|align=center|5:00
|Fort Hood, Texas, United States
|
|-
|Loss
|align=center|8–3
| Nick Pace
|Submission (Pace choke)
|The Ultimate Fighter 12 Finale
|
|align=center|3
|align=center|4:32
|Las Vegas, Nevada, United States
|
|-
|Win
|align=center|8–2
| Steve Garcia
|Decision (split)
|King of Kombat 9: Resurrection
|
|align=center|3
|align=center|5:00
|Austin, Texas, United States
|
|-
|Loss
|align=center|7–2
| Eddie Wineland
|TKO (punch to the body)
|WEC 49
|
|align=center|2
|align=center|4:44
|Edmonton, Alberta, Canada
|
|-
|Win
|align=center|7–1
| Coty Wheeler
|Decision (unanimous)
|WEC 46
|
|align=center|3
|align=center|5:00
|Sacramento, California, United States
|
|-
|Loss
|align=center|6–1
| Damacio Page
|Submission (rear-naked choke)
|WEC 43
|
|align=center|1
|align=center|1:02
|San Antonio, Texas, United States
|
|-
|Win
|align=center|6–0
| Tim Snyder
|TKO (punches)
|Urban Rumble Championships
|
|align=center|1
|align=center|2:59
|Pasadena, Texas, United States
|
|-
|Win
|align=center|5–0
| Bryan Goldsby
|Submission (triangle choke)
|Cage Kings: Total Domination
|
|align=center|2
|align=center|1:32
|Bossier City, Louisiana, United States
|
|-
|Win
|align=center|4–0
| Doug Sonier
|TKO (punches)
|SWC 3: Valentine's Day Massacre
|
|align=center|1
|align=center|1:36
|Frisco, Texas, United States
|
|-
|Win
|align=center|3–0
| Jason Horak
|KO (punches)
|Cage Kings: Destruction at the Dome
|
|align=center|2
|align=center|0:38
|Bossier City, Louisiana, United States
|
|-
|Win
|align=center|2–0
| Seth Drago
|Submission (guillotine choke)
|LFC 2: Anarchy
|
|align=center|1
|align=center|1:28
|Baton Rouge, Louisiana, United States
|
|-
|Win
|align=center|1–0
| Trevor Robbins
|TKO (punches)
|Cage Kings
|
|align=center|1
|align=center|0:48
|Bossier City, Louisiana, United States
|

References

External links 

1986 births
Living people
American male mixed martial artists
Mexican male mixed martial artists
Mixed martial artists from Texas
Bantamweight mixed martial artists
Flyweight mixed martial artists
Mixed martial artists utilizing Brazilian jiu-jitsu
American practitioners of Brazilian jiu-jitsu
Mexican practitioners of Brazilian jiu-jitsu
Ultimate Fighting Championship male fighters
People from Little Elm, Texas